Bad Magic is the successor of The Secret Series by Pseudonymous Bosch. It takes place in a mysterious summer camp for delinquents.  It was published in 2014. It centers on Paul-Clay (otherwise known just as Clay), Max Ernest's brother and is part of the series Bad Books. The books in the series are Bad Magic, Bad Luck, and Bad News.

Novels by Pseudonymous Bosch
2014 American novels
American children's novels 
Children's fantasy novels
2014 children's books
Little, Brown and Company books